Thiago do Rosário André (born 4 August 1995) is a Brazilian middle-distance runner.

Running career
He represented his country in the 1500 metres at the 2016 Summer Olympics without advancing from the first round.
He finished seventh in the 800 metres at the 2017 World Championships held in London.

He competed at the 2020 Summer Olympics.

Personal life
André took up athletics aged 14. He is married to Jessica Gonzaga and has a son Gabriel.

Competition record

References

External links

1995 births
Living people
Sportspeople from Rio de Janeiro (state)
Brazilian male middle-distance runners
Olympic athletes of Brazil
Athletes (track and field) at the 2016 Summer Olympics
Pan American Games athletes for Brazil
Athletes (track and field) at the 2015 Pan American Games
World Athletics Championships athletes for Brazil
Ibero-American Championships in Athletics winners
Troféu Brasil de Atletismo winners
Athletes (track and field) at the 2020 Summer Olympics
South American Championships in Athletics winners
21st-century Brazilian people
People from Bedford Roxo